Fukuyama Hachimangū (福山八幡宮, Fukuyama Hachimangū) is a Shinto shrine located in Fukuyama, Hiroshima Prefecture, Japan. It is a Hachiman shrine, dedicated to the kami Hachiman. The kami it enshrines include Emperor Ōjin, Empress Jingū, and Himegami (比売神).

See also 
List of Shinto shrines in Japan
Hachiman shrine

External links 
Official website

Hachiman shrines
Shinto shrines in Hiroshima Prefecture

Beppyo shrines